Shin Eun-soo (born October 23, 2002) is a South Korean actress. She made her acting debut as the female lead in 2016 film Vanishing Time: A Boy Who Returned. She also starred in television series The Legend of the Blue Sea (2016) and Bad Papa (2018).

Career

Pre-debut

Shin Eun-soo joined JYP Entertainment (JYPE) in 2014 to train as both a singer and an actress.

In 2015, she auditioned for the female lead role in movie Vanishing Time: A Boy Who Returned, written and directed by Um Tae-hwa. Though she never acted before, Shin was chosen out of 300 candidates to act alongside Gang Dong-won. She was given two months of preparation and acting training. The filming started on October 7 and she was officially introduced by JYPE on the 14th through the agency's SNS channels. She attended her first production conference at Apgujeong CGV in Gangnam-gu, Seoul on October 11, 2016.

2016–present: Acting debut
Shin debuted as an actress on November 16, 2016 with the release of Vanishing Time: A Boy Who Returned. She was praised for her performance in a major role despite being a newcomer in such a young age.

In late November 2016, she acted as the teenage of Jun Ji-hyun's character in the television series The Legend of the Blue Sea. In December, she was cast in a short film directed by Shunji Iwai titled Chang-ok's Letter where she played as Bae Doona and Kim Joo-hyuk's daughter. It was released on Nestle Theater's YouTube channel on February 16, 2017. She then lent her voice for the female lead in animated film titled The Shower, released in August. Shin also appeared as a supporting cast in the pre-produced web series by JYP Pictures titled School of Magic, along with several actors from her agency, which premiered on September 11.

In 2018, Shin starred with another lead role, alongside Jung Jae-won, in a one-act romance drama titled Anthology—a part of tvN's Drama Stage. She then acted in the film titled Illang: The Wolf Brigade, where she worked with actor Gang Dong-won for the second time. It was released on July 25, 2018. In July, she was cast in the family melodrama Bad Papa, playing the daughter of Jang Hyuk.

In 2019 and 2020, she played supporting roles in the film Homme Fatale, and in television series SF8 and Do Do Sol Sol La La Sol.

In 2022, Shin made a special appearance in KBS2's historical drama Bloody Heart as the childhood of Kang Han-na's character, and was reunited with Jang Hyuk whom she previously acted with in Bad Papa.

Filmography

Film

Television series

Web series

Hosting

Other ventures

Ambassadorship
In 2017, Shin was appointed as Honorary Ambassador of the 2nd Japan Film Festival, along with actor Yoon Park. In 2018, she was appointed as ambassador of the 20th Bucheon International Animation Festival (BIAF).

Endorsement
Shin signed her first-ever endorsement deal as the new exclusive model for South Korean skincare and cosmetics manufacturer and retailer, Skin Food. She launched a full-scale modeling activity, starting with a CF of the new product called Aqua Grape Bounce Bubble Serum for Skin Food 2017 S/S which was released on April 10, 2017. She was also featured in main page of the product.

Awards and nominations

References

External links

 Shin Eun-soo at Npio Entertainment 
 
 

2002 births
Living people
21st-century South Korean actresses
JYP Entertainment artists
South Korean child actresses
South Korean film actresses
South Korean television actresses